The Legend of the Emerald Lady is a book in the Nancy Drew mystery series by Carolyn Keene. It was released in paperback on May 1, 2000.

Plot summary
In the book, Nancy solves a mystery on the Caribbean island of St. Ann when visiting Sugar Moon, a nineteenth-century sugar plantation. She finds clues to a treasure in a faded love letter from a long-dead pirate.

Nancy Drew books
2000 American novels
2000 children's books
Novels set in the Caribbean
Novels set on islands